Chestermere (Kirkby Field) Airport  is located  east of Chestermere, Alberta, Canada.

See also
 List of airports in the Calgary area

References

External links
Airport website Skywalker.ca
Page about this airport on COPA's Places to Fly airport directory

Registered aerodromes in Alberta
Rocky View County